Bud and Bird is a live album by Gil Evans that won the Grammy Award for Best Large Jazz Ensemble Album in 1989. Evans conducted the orchestra, which included Hamiet Bluiett, Bill Evans, and Johnny Coles.

Reception

In 1989, the album received the Grammy Award for Best Large Jazz Ensemble Album posthumously. Allmusic awarded the album 3 stars stating "Some critics rapped Evans' '80s orchestras for their almost chaotic sound and loose feel. But Evans wanted a sprawling sensibility, and although his bands often seemed disorganized, they always maintained discipline in the midst of what others thought sounded like musical anarchy".

Track listing
 "Bud and Bird" (Gil Evans) - 8:48  
 "Half Man, Half Cookie" (Bill Evans) - 10:27  
 "Gates - Illuminations" (Mark Egan) - 17:40  
 "Nicaragua Blues" (Tom Malone) - 7:44  
 "Groove from the Louvre" (John Clark) - 21:51  
Recorded at Sweet Basil Jazz Club in NYC on December 1, 1986 (tracks 2 & 3) and December 22, 1986 (tracks 1, 4 & 5)

Personnel
 Gil Evans – piano, electric piano, arranger, conductor
 Lew Soloff, Shunzo Ohno, Miles Evans – trumpet
 Johnny Coles – flugelhorn (track 5)
 Dave Bargeron – trombone
 Dave Taylor – bass trombone
 John Clark – French horn, hornette, arranger
 Chris Hunter – alto sax, soprano sax, flute
 Bill Evans – tenor sax, soprano sax, flute, arranger
 Hamiet Bluiett – baritone sax, clarinet, bass clarinet
 Hiram Bullock – guitar
 Pete Levin, Gil Goldstein – keyboards
 Mark Egan – bass guitar, arranger
 Danny Gottlieb – drums

References 

1987 live albums
Gil Evans live albums
Albums arranged by Gil Evans
Grammy Award for Best Large Jazz Ensemble Album